Chase Cross is a district of the London Borough of Havering in London, England. The name is thought to come from its position as a crossroads in the chase (hunting ground) or Hainault Forest. The forest was cleared for agriculture in the 1850s, before being developed for housing in the 1930s.

Transport 
The B175 is the main road through Chase Cross between Passingford Bridge and the A12 in Romford. The A12 (Eastern Avenue), which runs 1 mile south of Collier Row at its southern end, leads to London and the east coast of Essex and East Anglia, crossing the M25 on its eastern section. The area is not connected to the London Underground or National Rail networks; however, Hainault station, Newbury Park station (Central line) and Romford railway station are nearby. Transport for London bus routes 103, 499, 651, 375 and commercial route 575 from Epping to Romford and Lakeside Shopping Centre serve Chase Cross.

Nearby places 
 Romford
 Collier Row
 Havering-atte-Bower
 Harold Hill
 Chigwell Row

References

Areas of London
Districts of the London Borough of Havering
Romford